The 2016 European University Games, also known as 2016 European Universiade, was the third biannual European Universities Games (EUG), the largest European multisport event, with 4800 participants from 403 universities in 41 countries. The event took place in the Croatian cities of Zagreb and Rijeka between 13 and 25 July 2016, and was organised by European University Sports Association (EUSA) and Croatian Academic Sport Federation (CASF) with the cooperation of University of Zagreb, University of Rijeka, City of Rijeka, City of Zagreb and Ministry of Science, Education and Sports (Croatia).

Introduction

Bid selection 
The host for the European Universities Games 2016 was decided on 1 June 2013 in Ljubljana, Slovenia, by the EUSA Executive Committee. The two bids were Zagreb and Rijeka in Croatia, and Coimbra in Portugal. The Croatian presentation was followed by a questions and answers session, and the same system applied also for the Portuguese delegation with the bidding city of Coimbra, which came next.

The Croatian delegation was led by Gordan Kozulj, the Chairman of the Bidding Committee, and other members of the delegation were Zeljko Jovanovic, Minister of Science, Education and Sports;  Pero Lucin, Rector of the University of Rijeka; Petra Radetic, President of Student Council of the University of Zagreb;  Jelena Pavicic Vukicevic, Deputy Mayor of the City of Zagreb and Zrinko Custonja, the President of the Croatian University Sports Federation (CASF). The Portuguese delegation was composed of Mr Ricardo Morgado, the Chairman of the Bidding Committee; Mr Emidio Guerreiro, Secretary of State for Sport and Youth; Mr Joao Gabriel Silva, Rector of the University of Coimbra; Mr Joao Barbosa De Melo, Mayor of Coimbra; Mr Bruno Barracosa, the President of the Academic University Sports Federation of Portugal (FADU) and Mr Tiago Martins, Vice-President of the Students Council of the University of Coimbra.

Before the announcement of the winning city was done, EUSA President Roczek stressed the quality of both bids and presentations, and then announced "The 3rd European Universities Games in 2016 will be organised in: Zagreb-Rijeka in Croatia" Coimba in Portugal was later chosen to host the European Universities Games 2018. Tradition of university sports in Croatia 
The first student sports club was founded 112 years ago at the University of Zagreb. The Federation of Academic Sports Clubs at the University of Zagreb was founded 92 years ago. Mandatory physical education classes were introduced in Croatian universities 52 years ago. Twenty eight years ago the first University Games, also known as Universiade was organized in Zagreb. The Croatian Academic Sports Federation was founded 22 years ago.
Organized primarily as a cultural and a social event, the 1987 Universiade in Zagreb helped bring infrastructural renaissance to the capital city of Croatia and created the prerequisites for the significant advancement of Croatian sport as a whole.

Sports

 Sport events 
The 2016 European University Games programme featured 21 sports including Compulsory sports (8), Optional sports (11), Demo sports programme (2) and sports for students with disabilities (2) for the first time in academical sport.

  Badminton (5)
  Basketball (2)
  Basketball 3x3 (5)
  Beach volleyball (2)
  Bridge (2)
  Chess (4)
  Climbing (3)
  Football (2)
  Futsal (2)
  Golf (2)
  Handball (2)
  Judo (16)
  Karate (12)
  Rowing (21)
  Rugby sevens (2)
  Swimming (33)
  Table tennis (8)
  Volleyball (2) (details)
  Water polo (2) (details)
  Tennis (2)
  Taekwondo (20)

 Venues 

 Venues in Zagreb 

 Dom sportova 
 Badminton(1)

 Dvorana Pauk 
Bridge
Chess

 Football 

 SRC Jarun 
Rowing

 Opening ceremony 
The EUG 2016 Opening Ceremony took place on Wednesday, July 13, 2016 at 21.00 with a live TV broadcast by the national TV broadcaster (Croatian Radiotelevision - HRT), and a duration of 120 minutes. The tickets for the opening ceremony were free, but without them it was not possible to enter the event area – the athletics stadium of the Sports Park Mladost in Zagreb.

Directed by Krešimir Dolenčić, the ceremony started with an introduction of host cities. Zagreb was depicted as the city of universities, parks, museums, art and sporting success, while Rijeka was depicted as the city of naval tradition, torpedoes, rock and roll, good vibrations and the world’s second largest carnival. Croatian singer Damir Kedžo and the University of Zagreb’s choir Concordia discors performed the official song of the Games– As long as heart believes. The anthem describes the synergy of faith and hard work, which explains its popularity among the athletes who came to the Games. It is not easy to study and achieve good sporting results at the same time, and the very fact that they are participating makes all student athletes at the Games champions of hard work, faith, knowledge, and labor. A parade of this year’s participants ensued; the participants and the organizers of the 1987 Universiade carried the flag of the European University Sports Association, leading the parade– legendary basketball coach Mirko Novosel, the president of the Executive Board of the 1987 Universiade, lawyer Vladimir Pezo, the former Mayor of Zagreb, Dr. Mato Mikić, the director of the security sector of the 1987 Universiade, Lieutenant General Mate Laušić, the director of the opening ceremony of the 1987 Universiade, Paolo Magelli, and theatre director and producer Duško Ljuština, who was the director of the culture sector at the 1987 Universiade. The first group of flag-carriers then passed the flag to the second group, consisting of several Croatian trophy-winning athletes: longtime member of the Croatian national water polo team Dubravko Šimenc, basketball player Danira Bilić, backstroke swimmer Gordan Kožulj, basketball player and coach Aleksandar Petrović, tennis player Renata Šašak and water polo player Samir Barać. Over five thousand participants walked the athletic track at Mladost Stadium, entering the track in alphabetical order by the name of the country they came from. The hosts occasionally made interesting remarks about the 403 universities participating in the Games. The hosts walked at the tail of the parade – Croatian students came from 16 universities from Zagreb, Osijek, Karlovac, Rijeka, Split, Pula, Vukovar and Dubrovnik. Before the oaths were taken, the attendees were addressed by the president of the European Universities Games Zagreb – Rijeka 2016 Zrinko Čustonja, the Rector of the University of Zagreb Damir Boras, the president of the European University Sports Association Adam Roczek and the Croatian Prime Minister Tihomir Orešković.

In the end, contestants and referees took their oaths. On behalf of the contestants the oath was taken by Ana Lenard, a karateist from Zagreb, while Ivan Šverko, a basketball referee from Rijeka, took the oath on behalf of the referees.

 Closing Ceremony 
The closing ceremony of the European Universities Games in Zagreb and Rijeka took place at Rijeka Korzo on July 25, 2016. These third European Universities Games were the greatest and biggest to date by the number of participants, with almost six thousand student athletes from 403 universities and 41 European countries who competed in Rijeka and Zagreb over the two weeks.

The ceremony was attended by numerous dignitaries who praised the organizers and congratulated the participants on their results. Near the very end of tonight’s programme, after the young bell-ringers passed him the flag of EUSA, Daniel Moreno, representative of the next host of the European Universities Games – the Portuguese city of Coimbra, addressed the audience as well:

‘First of all, I would like to congratulate the Croatian Academic Sports Federation, Zagreb and Rijeka on these great European Universities Games 2016. This is a great moment for the university sports movement. The standard of quality these games have set is high, and we will do our best to deliver an event as this one in Coimbra, Portugal in 2018.’

The Games, which were opened with a great opening ceremony at Mladost Stadium in Zagreb, were closed today in Rijeka, thus symbolically closing the circle of organization of the largest multi-sport event in recent Croatian history.

 Medals 

 Symbols 

Verbal identity: motto

The slogan Hearth believes, mind achieves, proclaims idea of dualism, which is integrated in the very proposal of the dual candidature of Zagreb and Rijeka, and its basic idea is officially explained as follows: "The slogan is the basic concept of the synergy of the heart and mind, two mighty organs of great contrast; however only through their joint work it is possible to achieve the proper functioning of the human body. The concept of dualism and synergy of the heart and mind, promote all the key values that student sports represent: ratio, education, prudence, strength, energy, fighting spirit and love – characteristics that help young people achieve excellence in their academic and athletic lives. The slogan also rests on the concepts of faith as a motivator, and achievement as a result of the successful sports activity. Both concepts represent important elements of sports – faith in one self and one’s own capabilities, faith in victory, the achievement of results, the worthiness of persistence and in vested effort."

Visual identity: logo
The author of the visual identity is Croatian graphic designer Jurica Dolić, who described his solution as follows:
"The visual identity embodies the verbal identity aspect by incorporating the symbol of the heart (shape, red colour) and mind (circle, blue colour). It also embodies a number of other symbols which have an exceptional importance for the candidature of Zagreb and Rijeka: Colours – red, white and blue are the representative colours of Croatian national symbols. Red is the colour of Rijeka, while blue is the representative colour of Zagreb. Shapes – white shapes (inside the blue circle) symbolize the number 16 (year of holding the Games – 2016). Furthermore, these shapes denote the silhouette of “Zagi” (the exceptionally popular mascot of the Zagreb Universiade from 1987), and in the combination with the red colour of the heart portrays a flame as the symbol of the sporting and Olympic spirit."

The mascot
After public voting, the figure of hamster became an official mascote of EUG2016. Final selection of the mascot is the result of the selection process that began in September 2014, after which at an open call 64 applications with mascot suggestions arrived. Nine-member jury selected three finalists that were presented to the public who was offered the opportunity to make a final decision of the EUG 2016 mascot in the second round of the competition. The winning suggestion was the one by Croatian authors Vedran Rede and Matija Tomšić who created the mascot of hamster, suggesting that it is important to participate and not always to win.

 Official Anthem 
'As long as heart believes' is official song of European Universities Games Zagreb-Rijeka 2016.

Author of music and lyrics: Bruno Kovačić

Arrangement and production: Nikša Bratoš

Lyrics:Look at me, I'm strong and so aliveI can run and I can fly so highAnd chase the birdsUp to the skyI can do itAt least I can tryI can write a song about us allMake a chorus sound so lyricalSo beautifulAnd powerfulLet us sing together to the worldSomewhere in the future I will beLooking at my younger meFeeling proud of what my mind achievesFor as long as heart believesSomeday we'll have children of our ownPlanet Earth, still our only homeThis blue dot we knowWhere we love and growWill keep on living if we make it so''

See also
 2012 European Universities Games
 European University Sports Association
 1987 Summer Universiade

References

External links 
 
 International University Sports Federation (FISU)
 European University Sports Association (EUSA)

European Universities Games
European Universities Games
Sports competitions in Zagreb
European Universities Games, 2016
European Universities Games
Sport in Rijeka
European Universities Games